Nomads Rugby Football Club plays in Hampshire 1 League, England.

History 
Nomads RFC, now known as Southsea Nomads RFC, was formed in May 1978 by a group of players who had all been members of the now defunct Portsmouth Civil Service RFC.  That club disbanded at the end of season ‘77-78 and some players not wishing to join other local clubs decided to form one of their own.  So with a meeting held at the “Old House at Home” Paulsgrove, Nomads RFC was born.

The name was chosen because the team had no home and the logo of a Snail wearing a scrum cap soon followed, as a snail is a Nomad who carries its home on its back.

Some of the original members are still around the club (Barry Bridgman, Colin Few ~ President, Ken Walker, Garry Barter, Nicky Cadle, Terry Welsh).

Nomads have had several temporary homes over the years. The “John Barleycorn”, Great Southsea St., which was its first home and now has been turned into a private dwelling.  The Royal Sailors Home Club, Queen Street from 1981 and Watersedge Park Community Centre which became its clubhouse from 1987.

It has also played at three different grounds, starting at Farlington, being moved by the council to Alexandra Park, then to the Eastern Road Sailing Centre Ground (the best) and then back to Farlington.  Its home now is the Portsmouth University ground at the end of Locksway Road, with its Clubhouse being the "Old House at Home" pub not far from it.

They were founder members of the then Courage Leagues in 1989, forming part of the Hampshire league set up.

They were the first club in Hampshire to form and run a Women's team, though this team disbanded at the end of the 1999–2000 season.

They have run three sides for Men in the past (including a veterans team) but are reduced to two now as there seems to be a general reduction in the numbers of people playing Rugby.

Kevin Darnley of Portsmouth started with Nomads, as did Douggie Setchell of Gosport, Robbie Allsopp, Tony Armstrong of Havant and most recently John Brothers of Trojans.

The side was (in 2011–2012) in Hampshire Division One, led by skipper Chris Groves.

Club Motto
Relinque numquam mulsum adiacentem, which, very roughly translates to "never leave your beer loafing".. fair warning!

Club Honours
Hampshire 2 champions: 2010–11.

Notable former players
Tobias Cutler

See also
 Marlborough Nomads
 Nomads Rugby
 Rugby Union

References

External links
 Hampshire Rugby
 Nomads RFC

English rugby union teams